The Olympus PEN E-PL9 is a rangefinder-styled digital mirrorless interchangeable lens camera announced by Olympus Corp. in February 2018. It succeeds the Olympus PEN E-PL8. The E-PL9 was succeeded by the Olympus PEN E-PL10 announced in October 2019.

References

Olympus digital cameras